Overstrand is a village (population 1,030) on the north coast of Norfolk in England, two miles east of Cromer. It was once a modest fishing station, with all or part of the fishing station being known as Beck Hythe. In the latter part of the 19th century it was catapulted into prominence, and became known as “the village of millionaires”.

History
The village's name means 'ridge shore', or perhaps 'narrow shore' to contrast with nearby Sidestrand.

The London journalist and travel writer Clement Scott came to Overstrand in 1883, christened the area ‘’Poppyland’’, and wrote about the church tower on the cliff edge and its “Garden of Sleep”. While in Overstrand he stayed at the Mill House with miller Alfred Jermy and his daughter Louie, who became “the Maid of the Mill” in his articles about ‘’Poppyland’’.

Scott had many London contacts in the theatrical world, and his writings led a number of them and others from London society to come to Overstrand. Some bought land in the village and had houses built there, and for a while the village was the place to visit. A large hotel was built on the cliff edge, though this slid into the sea in the 1950s.

The Edwardian architect Sir Edwin Lutyens worked at Overstrand, designing Overstrand Hall for Charles William Mills, 2nd Baron Hillingdon, The Pleasaunce for Cyril Flower, 1st Baron Battersea and the Methodist Church.  The large houses of the gentry have largely passed from private ownership to other uses.

Overstrand railway station was on the Norfolk and Suffolk Joint Railway between Cromer and North Walsham. It is now closed.

The Overstrand biplane bomber was named after the village, having been made at the Boulton & Paul aircraft factory in Norwich in the early 1930s.

In popular culture
Season 1, episode 2 of  the BBC TV series Screen Two was called "Poppyland" (1985). Directed by John Madden, it took place in Overstrand and tells the story of Clement Scott in his travels there.

Coastal erosion
As with much of the Norfolk coast, erosion was and continues to be a major problem. Clifton Way is an experimental site; its sea defences include riprap (at £1,300 a boulder, predominantly shipped from Norway), wooden groynes, revetments, gabions and Offshore Reefs.  The cliffs of soft boulder clay slump because of the water running through the clay, and the resulting material on the beach is removed by the succeeding high tides. In the neighbouring village of Sidestrand, the church was moved back from the cliff edge in the 19th century, though the tower of the church was left standing on the cliff top.

Sport and leisure

Overstrand Cricket Club is an English amateur cricket club. The club was established in 1946 and is based on Overstrand Sports Ground.
Overstrand CC have 2 Saturday senior XI teams that compete in the Norfolk Cricket League, and a Sunday 1st XI side.

Overstrand Bowls Club is also situated on Overstrand Sports Ground, but it's origins predate the current site to at least the 1920s. The club participates in two leagues: The Norfolk Federation County League and the Norfolk Afternoon League.

Media
Poppyland Radio, a digital community radio station for North Norfolk broadcasts from the town. Launched in February 2022, it claimed a silver medal at the 2022 Community Radio Awards.

References

  Office for National Statistics & Norfolk County Council, 2001"  Census population and household counts for unparished urban areas and all parishes."
 English place names, Overstrand

Further reading
Poppyland – Strands of Norfolk History, Stibbons and Cleveland, Pub: Poppyland Publishing, Fourth ed. 2001, 
Poppyland – in Pictures

External links 

Overstrand Life - Janet's Diaries - Village resident's blog, plus information about the area, where to stay etc.
Overstrand village website History of village in photographs and text.
Overstrand in the Great War

North Norfolk
Villages in Norfolk
Populated coastal places in Norfolk
Civil parishes in Norfolk
Beaches of Norfolk